Pandia is a village in Purushottampur block, Ganjam district, Odisha, India.

Villages in Ganjam district